Abiemnom County (or Biemnom) is an administrative area in the extreme northwest of Ruweng Administrative Area, South Sudan.  It borders Southern Kordofan in Sudan to the north.

The main ethnic group are the Ruweng Dinka.
The headquarters of the county are in the town of Abiemnom.
The county is divided into five Payams: Manajoka, Panyang, Bang Bang, Abiemnom and Awor Piny.
The Malual River and Kiir River both cross Abiemnom on their way to the Nile.
Although the county lies outside the Sudd, it is affected by swamps.
As of 2009, the only health care in the county was provided by four nurses.

After the April 2010 elections, forces led by General Galwak Gai, said to be composed of defecting SPLA/SSPA elements, staged attacks against SPLA garrisons and checkpoints in Abiemnom, Mayom, and Rubkona counties.
As of June 2010 the county was affected by militia attacks and also by Messeryia migrations and attacks.
In May 2010 there were 3,153 Internally Displaced People in Abiemnom town.

References

Ruweng Administrative Area
Counties of South Sudan